Narimanovsky District is an administrative and municipal district (raion), one of the eleven in Astrakhan Oblast, Russia. It is located in the southwest of the oblast. Its administrative center is the town of Narimanov. As of the 2010 Census, the total population of the district was 45,457, with the population of Narimanov accounting for 25.3% of that number.

Population
Ethnic Russians are the biggest ethnic group in the district and make up around 41% of its population. Ethnic minorities include Kazakhs (25%), Tatars (20%) and the Roma (2%).

Ethnic composition (2010):
 Russians – 41.6%
 Kazakhs – 24.9%
 Tatars – 20.4%
 Roma – 2.1%
 Dargins – 2%
 Turks – 1.6%
 Kalmyks – 1.6%
 Chechens – 1.3%
 Others – 4.5%

References

Notes

Sources

Districts of Astrakhan Oblast